Keefton (also known as Keefeton) is an unincorporated community and census-designated place (CDP) in Muskogee County, Oklahoma, United States.

On May 23, 1973 an F4 tornado hit Keefeton directly, obliterating 75% of the town.  The tornado traveled in a SW to NE direction, with 5 deaths -- 4 of which were in a pickup truck that was rolled for approximately 1/2 mile. 

A tornado measuring EF1 on the Enhanced Fujita Scale struck near Keefeton on May 15, 2020.

Demographics

References

Unincorporated communities in Muskogee County, Oklahoma
Unincorporated communities in Oklahoma
Census-designated places in Muskogee County, Oklahoma
Census-designated places in Oklahoma